Abdul Qayum Wardak (c. 1923–1999) was a politician from Afghanistan. Obtained B.S. degree in mathematics, University of Illinois, 1952; and M.A. degree in Nuclear Physics, Georgetown University, 1954. Returned to Afghanistan, 1955. Graduate studies in the Soviet Union. Attended School of Nuclear Science, Lemont, Illinois, 1957. Physics Teacher, Kabul Military Academy, 1955. Member, Faculty of Science, Kabul University, 1960. Dean of Science Faculty, Kabul University, 1972. Minister of Mines and Industries, 1973–75. Minister of Education, 1974. Minister of Tribal Affaires, 1976. Married to Masuma Esmati Wardak (former Member of Parliament and Teacher at Pashto Academy).

References

External links
Famous Wardaks

Pashtun people
1999 deaths
Year of birth uncertain
1920s births